is a Japanese politician and the current governor of Fukushima Prefecture in Japan. He previously served as the vice-governor of his predecessor Yūhei Satō and was elected in October 2014 after Satō chose not to contest the election.

References 

1964 births
Living people
People from Nagano Prefecture
University of Tokyo alumni
Governors of Fukushima Prefecture